Alena Vachovcová (born 24 January 1974) is a Czech former table tennis player. She competed in the women's doubles event at the 2004 Summer Olympics.

References

External links
 

1974 births
Living people
Czech female table tennis players
Olympic table tennis players of the Czech Republic
Table tennis players at the 2004 Summer Olympics
People from Stod
Sportspeople from the Plzeň Region